Mullagh is a town, civil parish and townland in County Cavan, Ireland. , the town's population was 1,348. It lies in the south-east of the county, at the junction of the R191 and the R194 regional roads near the towns of Virginia and Bailieborough.

St Kilian and churches
The town has a heritage centre dedicated to St Kilian, who was born in Mullagh c 640 and was martyred in Würzburg in Franconia in northern Bavaria, Germany, in circa 689. The centre also has an exhibition related to ogham script and the development of illuminated manuscripts.

The Catholic church, a Victorian neo-Gothic structure located 400m from the village on the Virginia Road (R194), is named in memory of its patron, Saint Kilian. It was built in the late 1850s. Ruins of an earlier church, known as the Teampeall Ceallaigh, remain in what is now part of the Church of Ireland grounds located approximately 600m along the same road.

Development
Mullagh's population has seen an increase from 679 residents in the 2006 census, to 1,137 in the 2011 census, to 1,348 in the 2016 census.

The environs of the village have witnessed substantial housing and industrial development over these years. Mullagh's relative proximity to the new M3 motorway has had the effect of making the capital city more accessible to Mullagh and County Cavan.

Amenities
 Amenities locally include Mullagh Lake and Hill Walk (2 kilometers outside the village on the Virginia Road), Tennis Court and People's Park on Mullagh Fair Green, Children's Playground beside the St. Kilian's Heritage Center. The Edwin Carolan Memorial Park includes a full size GAA pitch (open to all sports), a 440-metre track around its perimeter, a multi purpose Sports Centre and Gym. In the winter, the track is lit each night from 7.30 to 10pm or so to facilitate walking and running.

Local community organisations
Local community organisations include a men's and ladies GAA club (Cúchulainns GFC), Community Games (athletics club), a drama society (Millrace Drama Group), a golf society, friendship club, parent and toddler group, Girl Guides and Boy Scouts. Separate committees include the Mullagh Tourism & Community Development Committee, Mullagh Tidy Towns, and St Kilian's Housing Association.

Transport
Bus Éireann route 108 provides three journeys a day (one on Sundays) to Kells in County Meath for onward journeys, and three journeys a day (one on Sundays) to the neighbouring town of Bailieborough

Events
Mullagh Fair Day was one of the biggest fairs in the North East, and its proximity to the Virginia Road railway station ensured that cattle purchased in Mullagh could easily be transported to ports in Dublin and Drogheda. However the opening of the Mullagh mart in 1957 finally brought to a close a long chapter in the history of Mullagh, since the first charters and licences were granted in 1621.

The Mullagh Tourism & Community Development Committee re-established the Fair Day in 1997, and it has since grown to be one of the largest one day shows in the North East. The fair takes place each year on the 2nd Sunday in September.

Historic associations
The V. Rev. Dr Jonathan Swift, Dean of St. Patrick's Cathedral in Dublin, wrote parts of Gulliver's Travels and The Tale Of The Tub whilst staying near Mullagh. Dean Swift was staying at the country home of his cleric friend The Rev. Thomas Sheridan at Quilca House, which is close to the old, historic Mullagh village. Other notable descendants from the (Quilca) Sheridan family are the 18th century playwright Thomas Sheridan and notable writer Richard Brinsley Sheridan.

The original historic village of Mullagh was situated over a kilometre north-west of the present village close to Mullagh Lake, just off the Virginia Road, but there no longer remain any distinguishing features.

People 
 Henry Brooke (1703-1783), novelist and dramatist, was born and raised at Rantavan House, very near Mullagh.
 T. P. McKenna, television actor (All Creatures Great and Small, Inspector Morse) 
 Brían F. O'Byrne, film, television and stage actor (Intermission, Brooklyn's Finest, Million Dollar Baby, FlashForward, Prime Suspect, Love/Hate)

See also
 List of towns and villages in Ireland

References

Towns and villages in County Cavan
Civil parishes of County Cavan
Townlands of County Cavan